Chewko is a rural locality in the Shire of Mareeba, Queensland, Australia. In the  Chewko had a population of 194 people.

Geography 
Chewko has the following mountains:

 Mount Abbot 
 Mount Aunt 
 Mount Uncle 
Chewko railway station is on the Tablelands railway line.

History 
In the  Chewko had a population of 194 people.

References 

Shire of Mareeba
Localities in Queensland